is a railway station in the town of Tōhoku in Aomori Prefecture, Japan, operated by the third sector railway operator Aoimori Railway Company.

Location
Kamikitachō Station is served by the Aoimori Railway Line, and is 57.4 kilometers from the terminus of the line at Aomori Station. It is 674.7 kilometers from Tokyo Station.

Surrounding area
 Lake Ogawara
 Kamikita Post Office

Station layout
Kamikitachō Station has one side platform and one island platform serving three tracks, connected to a single-story station building by a footbridge. Only the outer tracks 1 and 3 are in regular operation. The station is staffed.

Platforms

History
It became a station on the Tōhoku Main Line of the Japanese Government Railways (JGR), the pre-war predecessor to the Japan National Railway (JNR), on 1 July 1906. On 1 October 1959, the station was renamed to its present name. With the privatization of the JNR on 1 April 1987, it came under the operational control of East Japan Railway Company (JR East).

On 4 December 2010, the Tōhoku Shinkansen was successfully extended north to Shin-Aomori Station from Hachinohe. As a result of the opening of the bullet train between the two stations, that section of the Tōhoku Main Line including this station was transferred to the Aoimori Railway Company from JR East on the same day.

Services
Kamikitachō Station is primarily served by trains operating on a local service on the Aoimori Railway Line between Aomori and Hachinohe. Passenger trains serve Kamikitachō Station just over 17 hours a day from 6:12am to 11:23pm. In 2018, a daily average of 554 passengers boarded trains at Kamikitachō Station, an increase from the daily average of 213 passengers the station served in 2010, the final year of its ownership by JR East. In 2018, the station was the tenth busiest on the Aoimori Railway Line, excluding Aomori and Hachinohe stations, and the busiest along the rail line in the town of Tōhoku.

See also
List of railway stations in Japan

References

External links
Aoimori Railway station information page 

Railway stations in Aomori Prefecture
Railway stations in Japan opened in 1891
Tōhoku, Aomori
Aoimori Railway Line